Hypnosis is a 2020 Russian-Finnish drama film directed by Valery Todorovsky. It was theatrically released in Russia on October 15, 2020.

Plot 
A young guy named Misha goes to hypnosis sessions with the hope of getting rid of sleepwalking, but in the end he ceases to distinguish between reality and illusion.

Cast

References

External links 
 

2020 films
2020s Russian-language films
2020 drama films
Russian drama films